The Lure of the Track is a 1925 American silent drama film directed by J.P. McGowan and starring Sheldon Lewis, Macklyn Arbuckle and Dot Farley.

Cast
 Sheldon Lewis
 Macklyn Arbuckle		
 Dot Farley		
 June Norton	
 Tempe Pigott	
 Danny Hoy

References

Bibliography
 McGowan, John J. J.P. McGowan: Biography of a Hollywood Pioneer. McFarland, 2005.
 Nash, Jay Robert. The Motion Picture Guide 1988 Annual. Cinebooks, 1997.

External links
 

1925 films
1925 drama films
1920s English-language films
American silent feature films
Silent American drama films
American black-and-white films
Films directed by J. P. McGowan
1920s American films